Storden can refer to a community in the United States:

 The city of Storden, Minnesota
 Storden Township, Minnesota